Čelina is a village and administrative part of Borotice in Příbram District in the Central Bohemian Region of the Czech Republic.

History
The site at Čelina was historically a gold mining location, with archaeological studies at the mine retrieving materials stretching back to the 13th century. Since 1991 the mine has not been regularly used due to environmental concerns, despite the unusually abundant amount of gold inside.

Sights
There is a Jewish cemetery in the village, founded in the 18th century. The settlement used to have a Jewish community that began living in Čelina in 1830 and dwindled out primarily in the 19th century, and the last burial at the cemetery took place in 1918.

References

Populated places in Příbram District